David William Stead (born 26 May 1947) is a former New Zealand cricketer who played first-class cricket for Canterbury from 1969 to 1986.

A right-handed batsman and right-arm medium-pace and leg-spin bowler, Stead had his most successful season with the bat in 1980/81, when he made 479 runs at an average of 43.54, including his only century, 193 not out against Central Districts. He also took 6 for 79 in the first innings of the same match, but Central Districts won by three wickets. His best figures in first-class cricket were 7 for 99 against Otago in 1982–83, when Canterbury nevertheless lost by an innings.

His son Gary played Test cricket for New Zealand in 1999 and was appointed coach of the national team in August 2018. David's elder sister Janice also played cricket for New Zealand.

References

External links

1947 births
Living people
New Zealand cricketers
Canterbury cricketers
Cricketers from Christchurch
South Island cricketers